was a Japanese daimyō of the Edo period, who ruled the Matsumae Domain. Though he was a tozama daimyō, he served in the Tokugawa Shogunate as a rōjū. His court title was Izu no kami.

Youth
Takahiro, whose childhood name was Tamekichi, was born at Matsumae Castle in Ezo. He was the 6th son of Matsumae Akihiro, the 9th lord of Matsumae. At age 4, he was sent to the family estate in Edo. In an act most unusual for a daimyō's son, his education included the study of the English language.

He succeeded to lordship of Matsumae in 1849.

Rise to Power as Rōjū

Takahiro was appointed as rōjū in November 1864; this was a post that was unheard of for a tozama daimyō. The following year, he and his fellow rōjū Abe Masato were responsible for the opening of the Hyōgo port to foreign trade. However, as they did so against the wishes of the imperial court, the court issued orders calling for their dismissal from office. Both men lost their offices, court rank, and titles, and were forced to yield lordship of their domains. Takahiro retired in favor of his son Norihiro.

Death
Takahiro returned to Matsumae in the spring of 1866. Soon after, he contracted a fever and died at age 36. A few years after Takahiro's death, his grandson Nagahiro petitioned the imperial court for a pardon, which was granted, along with a restoration of his court rank and titles.

Media
Takahiro has appeared infrequently in fictional depictions of the bakumatsu era. Most recently he appeared as a minor character in the manga Kaze Hikaru.

References

Beasley, W.G. (2002). The Perry Mission to Japan, 1853-1854 London: Routledge.
Totman, Conrad. The Collapse of the Tokugawa Bakufu. Honolulu: University of Hawai'i Press.
"Matsumae-han" on Edo 300 HTML (2 Jul. 2008)

1829 births
1866 deaths
Tozama daimyo
Rōjū
Matsumae clan